Bagdemagus (pronounced /ˈbægdɛˌmægəs/), also known as Bademagu(s/z), Bagdemagu, Bagomedés, Baldemagu(s), Bandemagu(s), Bangdemagew, Baudemagu(s), and other variants (such as the Italian Bando di Mago or the Hebrew Bano of Magoç), is a character in the Arthurian legend, usually depicted as king of the land of Gorre and a Knight of the Round Table. He originally figures in literature the father of the knight Maleagant, who abducts King Arthur's wife Queen Guinevere in several versions of a popular episode. Bagdemagus first appears in French sources, but the character may have developed out of the earlier Welsh traditions of Guinevere's abduction, an evolution suggested by the distinctively otherworldly portrayal of his realm. He is portrayed as a kinsman and ally of Arthur and a wise and virtuous king, despite the actions of his son. In later versions, his connection to Maleagant disappears altogether.

Origins
King Bagdemagus first appears in Old French works of the late 12th century, but the principal episode in which he appears, the story of the abduction of Guinevere, developed out of significantly older traditions. Caradoc of Llancarfan's early 12th-century Latin Life of Gildas includes an episode in which Guinevere is kidnapped and taken to the "Isle of Glass", glossed as Glastonbury Tor, by Melwas, King of the "Summer Country". This Melwas is generally understood to be the original of Maleagant, Bagdemagus' son in the French works. Some other texts testify to the early popularity of this story; a version of it is alluded to in the Welsh poem known as "The Dialogue of Melwas and Gwenhyfar", which survives in two variants, and a "Meloas", lord of the Isle of Glass, is mentioned in Chrétien de Troyes' French romance Erec and Enide. Some writers have suggested that Bagdemagus should be identified with Baeddan, mentioned as the father of "Maelwys" in the early 12th-century Welsh romance Culhwch and Olwen. This identification relies on the suggestion proposed by E. K. Chambers that Maelwys is an alternate spelling of Melwas.

However, this suggestion is rejected by Rachel Bromwich and Simon Evans, among others, who instead connect Maelwys with the historical Irish prince Máel Umai, son of Báetán mac Muirchertaig. René Bansard looked on similar legends between king Baudemagus and hagiography of Bômer alias Bohamadus in Normandy near Gorron (possibly Gorre of the Arthurian romance), honoured in several parishes.

Appearances
The character is first mentioned in the 12th century in Chrétien de Troyes' Lancelot, the Knight of the Cart, where Bagdemagus (Bagomedés) is the king of Gore, a mysterious land connected to Logres only by a bridge as sharp as a sword, where many natives of Logres are kept prisoner; again, his son Maleagant abducts Guinevere, who is later rescued by the hero Lancelot. In the romance Sone de Nansai, Bagdemagus (Baudemagus) is said to be the father of Meleagant and the son of Tadus.

The story is repeated, without its supernatural overtones, in the later Vulgate Cycle; King Bagdemagus (various spellings) is presented as a cousin of Gawain and a friend of Lancelot, who condemns his son's evil deeds and acknowledges that his death at the hands of Lancelot was deserved. In the Vulgate Lancelot, Bagdemagus joins the Round Table by taking the seat that had belonged to Ganor who was accidentally killed by Lancelot in a jousting tournament. Bagdemagus is the King of Gorre at the same time as when Morgan le Fay is described as the Queen of Gorre and lives there, but the connection between their characters and their status is not explicitly explained. In Thomas Malory's Le Morte d'Arthur, the link between Bagdemagus and "Sir Meleagraunce" disappears, and Bagdemagus is just another knight of the Round Table, linked to Malory's version of Galehaut, until he is accidentally killed by Gawain at a tournament.

In both de Troyes and Malory, Bagdemagus also has an unnamed daughter who is an ally and friend of Lancelot, aiding his escape from respectively either Maleagant or Morgan le Fay in return for his helping her at another time. In Lancelot, the Knight of the Cart, she is mentioned as one of his daughters, suggesting that Bagdemagus has at least three children altogether.

King Bagdemagus is a very different character in the Post-Vulgate Cycle, in which he is a companion of Gawain and Yvain. Previously, he had also been the one who discovered the fate of Merlin in the course of his knight errant adventures. Bagdemagus fights for Arthur against King Claudas. He also comes close to being cruelly killed by King Pellinore when the latter finds out about the romance of Bagdemagus and his wife, but he is rescued by Gaheris. His death takes place in the Post-Vulgate Queste, after he discovers Mordred raping a young girl and then wounds him in a duel. Gawain, not knowing the identity of the knight who injured his brother, pursues Bagdemagus and gives him a mortal injury, but then despairs upon discovering the truth; Bagdemagus forgives Gawain before dying. In the Stanzaic Morte Arthur, Bagdemagus survives the Grail Quest and joins Lancelot's faction against Arthur in the civil war over Guinevere.

References

Sources
Bromwich, Rachel, and Evans, D. Simon (1992). Culhwch and Olwen: An Edition and Study of the Oldest Arthurian Tale. University of Wales Press.
Loomis, Roger Sherman (1997). Celtic Myth and Arthurian Romance. Academy Chicago Publishers. .

Arthurian characters
Knights of the Round Table